CA-SBR-3186 is an archaeological site located in the central Mojave Desert in San Bernardino County, California. The site, which is located on an alluvial fan on the north side of the Soda Mountains, includes 174 cairns. The cairns are estimated to have been built in the late prehistoric period due to the site's relative lack of aging. Archaeologists have speculated that indigenous peoples built the cairns as a method of controlling water flows.

The site was added to the National Register of Historic Places on February 10, 1981.

References

Archaeological sites on the National Register of Historic Places in California
San Bernardino County, California
National Register of Historic Places in San Bernardino County, California